Pediasia subepineura is a moth in the family Crambidae. It was described by Stanisław Błeszyński in 1954. It is found in Kazakhstan.

References

Crambini
Moths described in 1954
Moths of Asia